The 1919–20 Football League season, the first to be played after the First World War, was Birmingham Football Club's 24th in the Football League and their 16th in the Second Division. They finished in third position in the 22-team division, eight points behind the promotion places. They also took part in the FA Cup, entering at the first round proper and losing to Liverpool in the third (last 16).

Twenty-eight players made at least one appearance in nationally organised first-team competition, and there were fourteen different goalscorers. Forward Johnny Crosbie was ever-present over the 45-match season. Harry Hampton was leading scorer with 16 goals, all of which came in the league.

Football League Second Division

League table (part)

FA Cup

Appearances and goals

Players with name struck through and marked  left the club during the playing season.

See also
Birmingham City F.C. seasons

References
General
 Matthews, Tony (1995). Birmingham City: A Complete Record. Breedon Books (Derby). .
 Matthews, Tony (2010). Birmingham City: The Complete Record. DB Publishing (Derby). .
 Source for match dates and results: "Birmingham City 1919–1920: Results". Statto Organisation. Retrieved 19 May 2012.
 Source for lineups, appearances, goalscorers and attendances: Matthews (2010), Complete Record, pp. 280–81. Note that attendance figures are estimated.

Specific

Birmingham City F.C. seasons
Birmingham